FTV may refer to:

Television
 Fairchild TV, a Canadian Cantonese television network
 FashionTV, a television network
 Federalna televizija, a public service broadcasting organization of the Federation of Bosnia and Herzegovina
 Filipino TV, a Canadian Tagalog language television channel
 Formosa Television, a TV company in Taiwan
 Fantastic Television, a TV company in Hong Kong
 France Télévisions, the French state television network
 Fukushima Television Broadcasting, a TV company in Fukushima, Japan
 Free-to-view, a television term for encrypted but non-subscription television services
 Free view point television, a type of 3-D TV that allows the user to change the viewpoint
 Free view point television, a type of 3-D TV that allows the user to change the viewpoint

Other uses
An abbreviation for "female transvestite"; a female crossdresser

 flight test vehicle

See also

 
 FTA (disambiguation)
 F (disambiguation)